Founded in 1843, the School of Art & Design at Nottingham Trent University is one of the oldest in the United Kingdom.

History

In 1836, the Government Select Committee on Art and Manufactures produced a report highlighting concerns about the standard of design in the industry. Higher standards abroad forced manufacturers to buy or copy foreign designs. Later in 1836, the Board of Trade established the ‘Government School of Design’ in London, where, in 1837, it opened at Somerset House.

In order to encourage Practical Art in other populous areas of the UK, a ‘Government School of Design’ was then established in each of several provincial towns, where manufacturing industries were already in existence. Inevitably, the original title was adjusted to include the name of the town where it was located – whilst locally, being simply referred to as, the ‘School of Design’.

Somerset House in London in 1837, later the Royal College of Art, from 1896
Manchester, in 1838
York, in 1842
Nottingham, in 1843
Sheffield, in 1843 (September)
Birmingham, in 1843 (September)
Coventry, in 1843
Glasgow, in 1845
Norwich, in 1845

Historical Locations
The ‘School of Design’ opened on the 1 April 1843, at the People's Hall in Beck Lane (now Heathcote Street), moving to Plumptre House in Stoney Street in 1852, and to Commerce Square, off High Pavement, in 1858. In 1863, a site was purchased in Waverley Street for the construction of a building specifically for the school.

Building work started on 23 May 1863 but the foundation stone wasn't laid until 22 October that year when Henry Pelham-Clinton, 5th Duke of Newcastle was available for the ceremony. The school was opened by Henry Pelham-Clinton, 6th Duke of Newcastle on 19 June 1865. The architect was Frederick Bakewell. In front of the building is a statue of the artist Richard Parkes Bonington, produced by Watson Fothergill.

Current status

Location
Nottingham Trent University's City site is based close to Nottingham city centre.

The School of Art and Design is based at the university's City site, about half a mile from the city centre.

Art and design facilities
All of NTU's art and design courses are based at three buildings on the university's City site.

Bonington building — a labyrinthine three-story building.

Opened in 1969 by the Duchess of Kent, and upgraded in 2005. 
Included in the design, at the heart of the building, is a high-ceilinged exhibition space, known as 'Bonington Gallery'. It is one of the oldest art galleries in Nottingham.
Bonington was officially re-opened in May 2006 by Sir Paul Smith.

Modern art and design studios, workshops, ceramics and glass kilns
Photographic studios
Fashion studios, electronic garment and knitwear technology
Digital textile printing, digital loom and embroidery equipment
Laser cutting technology
Computer suites, CAD systems, image and sound editing studios
Exhibition galleries
Art and design shop
Café and social spaces

Waverley building — a restored, listed building with design heritage.

The Waverley building houses the Nottingham School of Art and Design since 1865. 
As part of the NTU's buildings regeneration plan, and in recognition of its importance and provenance, the university arranged for constructional adjustments and refurbishment to upgrade all the facilities, including an exhibition space, disabled access and an improved environment for both staff and students. The upgrade being completed in the year 2000 at a cost of £1.4M

Gallery and exhibition foyer
Working studio theatre
Design workshops and studios
Wardrobe department including dye and production facilities
Audio and video suites with editing facilities
Integrated Windows and Mac IT suites

Maudslay building — a centre for industry and technology.

During 2006, the Maudslay building was upgraded to incorporate design facilities and studios.

Product and furniture workshops: wood synthetics and metal fabrication facilities
Design studios and working display areas
IT learning unit, with computer-aided design (CAD) suite
'Rapid prototyping' modellers: machines creating a 3D solid object from a virtual computer model
Waterjet cutter: latest generation technology to cut and shape solid materials, such as glass, steel, granite and marble using a precision waterjet that travels at twice the speed of sound
CNC (computer-numerical control) router and brand new laser cutter
Location of designated placement office support unit for all courses
The Hive was designed for NTU staff, students and graduates, but was open to anyone with an idea they wanted to develop. During 2021 these facilities were transferred to the Dryden Enterprise Centre

Courses
Courses are offered at undergraduate levels (BA Hons in numerous disciplines) and also MAs in a wide range of subjects.

There is an MA by 'Registered Project or thesis', offered as a flexible postgraduate course, allowing students to tailor their course specifically around their areas of individual interest.

Industrial links
In the field of art and design, NTU has links with a wide range of companies, professional bodies and institutions on an international level, including Apple, Arcadia Group, Boots (company), Broadway, Fashion Institute of Technology, Association of Illustrators, Marks & Spencer, Sony, and Sophie Steller.

International students
The university has international liaison staff, course tutors and trained counsellors to give international students advice and practical help, and also offers a detailed orientation programme the week before term begins.
University representatives regularly travel to international education fairs to give advice and information to overseas applicants.

International exchanges
NTU has links across Europe, the United States, Japan, Korea, China, Australia, India, Africa, and the Far East, both through individual contacts and exchange programmes.

Many of NTU's undergraduate courses offer the opportunity to spend time studying at a university overseas.  Students can do this in Europe through the Erasmus Programme, previously known as the Socrates programme from 1994 until 1999, and then Socrates II from 2000 until 2006. For countries worldwide, there is the university's study abroad scheme.

The NFFC Badge
In early 1973, Mr R. Lyon FRSA, the deputy director of Trent Polytechnic, and Mr W. Payne ARCA, the Associate Head of the Graphics Department of the College of Art, were approached by the Nottingham Forest Football Club, for advice regarding the design of a new badge. The Nottingham Evening Post Sports Editor was then consulted, resulting in a competition being organised, which was announced in March 1973. There were 855 entries, some from other countries. (587 in the adult section and 268 in the junior section.)

The winning design was by Trent Polytechnic graphic designer and lecturer, David Lewis. To maintain anonymity, David Lewis entered his design using his mother's maiden name. The reason being, that one of the five judges was Mr W. Payne, his head of department at Trent Polytechnic.
After winning the competition, David Lewis adapted his entry to produce the final design. 
His explanation, describing the new badge, is reproduced below, as printed on page eleven in the Forest Programme of Saturday 8 September 1973:

The above paragraph is quite similar to the final part of this longer piece. Also see 'Talk' for anecdote.

Notable alumni
 Richard Evans – Graphic designer of album covers and music-related design
 Dudley D. Watkins – Creator of Lord Snooty and Desperate Dan for the Beano and Dandy comics.
 Dame Laura Knight – Artist and Royal Academician
 Arthur Henry Knighton-Hammond – Artist

References

External links
 'Nottingham School of Art', Mapping the Practice and Profession of Sculpture in Britain and Ireland 1851–1951, University of Glasgow History of Art and HATII, online database 2011 
 RIBA, Origins of the RCA 

Educational institutions established in 1843
School of Art and Design
Art schools in England
Design schools
1843 establishments in England